Chromyl chloride is an inorganic compound with the formula CrO2Cl2. It is a reddish brown compound that is a volatile liquid at room temperature, which is unusual for transition metal complexes.

Preparation
Chromyl chloride can be prepared by the reaction of potassium chromate or potassium dichromate with hydrogen chloride in the presence of sulfuric acid, followed by distillation.

K2Cr2O7 + 6 HCl  → 2 CrO2Cl2 + 2 KCl + 3 H2O
The sulfuric acid serves as the dehydration agent. It can also be prepared directly by exposing chromium trioxide to anhydrous hydrogen chloride gas.

CrO3 + 2 HCl ⇌ CrO2Cl2 + H2O

The method used to prepare chromyl chloride is the basis for a qualitative test for chloride: a sample suspected of containing chloride is heated with a mixture of potassium dichromate and concentrated sulfuric acid. If chloride is present, chromyl chloride forms as evidenced by red fumes of CrO2Cl2. Analogous compounds are not formed with fluorides, bromides, iodides and cyanides.

Reagent for oxidation of alkenes
Chromyl chloride oxidizes internal alkenes to alpha-chloroketones or related derivatives. It will also attack benzylic methyl groups to give aldehydes via the Étard reaction. Dichloromethane is a suitable solvent for these reactions.

Safety considerations

CrO2Cl2 decomposes violently on contact with water to release hydrochloric acid (HCl) and chromic acid (H2CrO4). Although not combustible, chromyl chloride is a strong oxidizer and can spontaneously ignite or explode on contact with flammable substances. In case of fire, no direct contact should be made with water.

Additionally, chromyl chloride is severely corrosive and easily burns the skin and eyes, and ingestion would cause severe internal damage. Its vapours are also strongly irritating to all parts of the body.

Chronic: CrVI can produce chromosomal aberrations and is a human carcinogen via inhalation. Frequent exposure of the skin to chromyl chloride may result in ulceration.

See also
Bromine

References

External links
 CDC - NIOSH Pocket Guide to Chemical Hazards - Chromyl Chloride

Chromium(VI) compounds
Chromium–halogen compounds
Oxychlorides
Oxidizing agents
Carcinogens
Chromium–oxygen compounds